Bradfield may refer to:

Places

Australia
 Bradfield College (Sydney), a senior high school in New South Wales
 Bradfield Highway, Sydney
 Division of Bradfield, an electoral division in New South Wales
 RAAF Bradfield Park, an Australian air station

United Kingdom
 Bradfield, Berkshire, a village and civil parish
 Bradfield College, a secondary school
 Bradfield, Devon, a location in England
 Bradfield House, a mansion in Uffculme, Devon,
 Bradfield, Essex, a village and civil parish
 Bradfield Heath, a village
 Bradfield, Norfolk, a village
 Bradfield, South Yorkshire, a civil parish in the City of Sheffield
 Bradfield Dale, a rural valley
 Bradfield School, a secondary school
 Low Bradfield, a village
 High Bradfield, a village
 Bradfield, Suffolk
 Bradfield Combust, a village
 Bradfield St Clare, a village and civil parish
 Bradfield St George, a village and civil parish
 Bradfield Woods, a nature reserve

United States
 Bradfield Canal, an inlet in Alaska
 Bradfield Corner, Indiana, an unincorporated community in Wabash Township, Parke County, Indiana
 Bradfield Elementary School, a school in Highland Park, Dallas, Texas
 Bradfield Hall, an academic building in Cornell University at Ithaca, New York
 Davenport-Bradfield House, a historic home in Sheridan, Indiana

Zimbabwe
 Bradfield, Zimbabwe, a neighborhood in the city of Bulawayo

Other uses
 Bradfield (surname)
 HMS Bradfield, Royal Navy minesweeper during World War I
 3430 Bradfield, a main-belt asteroid
 Comet Bradfield (disambiguation)

See also
 Bradfield Scheme, proposed Australian irrigation scheme